Brachys ovatus is a species of metallic wood-boring beetle in the family Buprestidae. It is found in Central America and North America.

Subspecies
These two subspecies belong to the species Brachys ovatus:
 Brachys ovatus bellporti Nicolay & Weiss
 Brachys ovatus ovatus

References

Further reading

External links

 

Buprestidae
Articles created by Qbugbot
Beetles described in 1801